Large-scale structure may refer to:

 Large-scale structure of the Universe
 A megastructure
 A global social structure